The cardiac transient outward potassium current (referred to as Ito1 or Ito  ) is one of the ion currents across the cell membrane of heart muscle cells. It is the main contributing current during the repolarizing phase 1 of the cardiac action potential. It is a result of the movement of positively charged potassium (K+) ions from the intracellular to the extracellular space. Ito1 is complemented with Ito2 resulting from Cl− ions to form the transient outward current Ito.

Mechanism
Ito1 is rapidly activated and deactivated. It is activated after the fast increase of the membrane potential following the phase 0 of the cardiac action potential. Once activated, (K+) ions from inside the cells flow to the extracellular space. This outward flow of positively charged ions constitutes the Ito1 and causes the transmembrane voltage to decrease. This decrease of the transmembrane potential is known as repolarization. Ito1 is then quickly deactivated, stopping the repolarization and ending the phase 1 of the action potential.

Ito1 is Ca2+-independent and has been clearly demonstrated in myocytes from different cardiac regions and species. There are two kinetic variants of cardiac Ito1: fast Ito1, called Ito1,f, and slow Ito, called Ito1,s. The channel responsible for Ito1,f is formed by assembly of Kv4.2 (KCND2) subunits, Kv4.3 (KCND3) subunits or a combination of the two, while the channel responsible for Ito1,s is composed of Kv1.4 (KCNA4) subunits. In addition, several regulatory subunits and pathways modulating the level and biophysical properties of cardiac Ito have been identified.

Ito1 affects the opening of Ca2+ channels during Phase 2 of the Action Potential. As a result, changes in Ito1 modulate changes in the action potential duration.

Role in disease
Reduction in Ito1 density is associated with prolonged action potentials and is a common finding in cardiac disease . 
Ito1 density is significantly lower in the cells of a failing heart in comparison to the cells of a healthy heart. 
There is correlation between decreased Ito1 density and atrial fibrillation. 
Ito activation is inhibited by thyrotropin (TSH). This mechanisms may be one of the reasons for the observation that both bradycardia and atrial fibrillation are common in hypothyroidism.
An increase in the Ito1 density caused by a mutation in Kv4.3 can be a cause of Brugada Syndrome.

References

Electrophysiology
Cardiac electrophysiology